I Can't Say No or Can't say No may refer to:
"Can't Say No", the 2012 debut single of Conor Maynard
"I Cain't Say No", song in the stage play Oklahoma, made famous by Celeste Holm
"I Can't Say No!", 2015 song by Lea Rue
"I Can't Say No", song by The Louvin Brothers from Nearer My God to Thee, 1957
"I Can't Say No", song by Natalie Cole from her 1975 album Inseparable
"I Can't Say No!!!!!", song by BiS, 2017